U218 may refer to:

 U218 Singles, a compilation album by U2
 U218 Videos, a DVD of U2 music videos
 German submarine U-218, a German submarine during World War II
 Uranium-218 (U-218 or 218U), an isotope of uranium